Anuradha Bhasin, sometimes known as Anuradha Bhasin Jamwal,  is an Indian left-wing journalist based in the city of Jammu. She is the executive editor of the newspaper Kashmir Times a publication founded by her father, Ved Bhasin, with patronage (including free land) received from the Congress party. 

Bhasin was born the daughter of left-wing journalist Ved Bhasin and his wife Vimal Bhasin. She has worked at her father's newspaper, the Kashmir Times, since 1989 when she joined the publication as a trainee reporter. As a journalist, Bhasin claims to have been the first to conduct "in-depth investigative reporting on the psychological aspects" of people living in the Kashmir conflict region.

In 2016, at an advanced age, Bhasin received a fellowship under the Commonwealth Scholarship and Fellowship Plan for her strident and consistent opposition of the Narendra Modi government. Her scholarly exertions under this fellowship were published in the Economic and Political Weekly, which is a reputed but non-academic weekly publication, and  the Journal of Borderlands Studies, an obscure, purportedly academic journal.

Bhasin was instrumental in the filing of a writ at the Supreme Court of India, which resulted in partial restoration of communication services during the 2019–2020 Jammu and Kashmir lockdown. Following the litigation, the offices of the newspaper were shut down by authorities and she was presented with an immediate eviction notice, which according to her was vendetta from the central government. Government action against Bhasin and the Kashmir Times received widespread condemnation including from the Editor's Guild of India. Nevertheless, Bhasin has severely criticized other Kashmiri newspaper editors for maintaining silence on prevalent issues in the union territory of Jammu and Kashmir, and characterised their editorial standing as "Orwellian Media Policy 2020".

References

Living people
Indian journalists
Year of birth missing (living people)